Jaime Boyer (née Cruickshank; born January 4, 1986) is a Canadian Olympic bobsledder who competed in the sport from 2004–08. Her best finish in the Bobsleigh World Cup was second in the two-woman event at Lake Placid in December 2006.

She finished fourth in the mixed bobsleigh-skeleton team event at the 2007 FIBT World Championships in St. Moritz.

She also finished 13th in the two-woman event at the 2006 Winter Olympics in Turin.

Jaime had since decided to retire from the Canadian World Cup Bobsleigh team in late 2008.

Jaime is truly lucky to have an extremely supportive family. Her parents Alan & Odarka Cruickshank attended all 6 World Championships in the 3 different sports Jaime competed internationally in (Gymnastics, Track and Field, Bobsleigh). As well, her parents, brother Mark Cruickshank and grandmother Sonja Pillipow cheered her on as she competed in the 2006 Olympic Winter Games.

References
FIBT profile

1986 births
Living people
Bobsledders at the 2006 Winter Olympics
Canadian female bobsledders
Olympic bobsledders of Canada
21st-century Canadian women